Florence Angela Margaret Mortimer Barrett, MBE (née Mortimer; born 21 April 1932) is a British former world No. 1 tennis player. Mortimer won three Grand Slam singles titles: the 1955 French Championships, the 1958 Australian Championships, and 1961 Wimbledon Championships when she was 29 years old and partially deaf.

Mortimer also teamed with Anne Shilcock to win the women's doubles title at Wimbledon in 1955, her only women's doubles title at a major. She teamed with Coghlan to reach the women's doubles final at the 1958 Australian Championships. Mortimer and Peter Newman reached the mixed doubles final at the 1958 Australian Championships, her only mixed doubles final at a major.

She is married to the former player and broadcaster John Barrett. Following the death of Shirley Fry in 2021, Mortimer became the longest still surviving Wimbledon ladies singles champion.

Career
Mortimer reached the quarterfinals of the US National Championships, then lost to second seed Doris Hart. At Wimbledon in 1953, seeded no. 5, she reached the quarterfinals, losing to Dorothy Knode. She also reached the quarterfinals in 1954, 1956 (losing to countrywoman Pat Ward Hales), 1959 (when she was seeded no. 2 but lost to Sandra Reynolds), and 1960 (losing to champion Maria Bueno). At Wimbledon in 1958, unseeded, she beat the former champion Margaret DuPont in the quarterfinals, then French champion Zsuzsa Körmöczy 6–0, 6–1 in the semifinals, and lost the final against the defending champion Althea Gibson in straight sets. In 1961, she won the title, defeating top-seeded Sandra Reynolds 11–9, 6–3 in the semifinals and then Christine Truman in the final in three sets. Not fully fit in 1962, she lost to eventual finalist Vera Sukova in the fourth round.

In 1955, she was the first British woman since 1937 to win one of the Grand Slams when she defeated Dorothy Knode in the final of the French Championships. During the long final set, she has said that she was given new heart when she heard her opponent asking for a brandy on court. Defending her title the following year, she reached the final, losing to Althea Gibson in two sets. During this year, she experienced a severe illness, not returning to full form until 1958.

She won the Australian title in 1958 when recuperating, defeating Lorraine Coghlan in the final. Her best result in the U.S. Championships was in 1961 when she reached the semifinals, losing to Ann Haydon. She won three times against Althea Gibson in her career, and she made her farewell in the Torquay tournament of 1962, beating Ann Haydon Jones in the final.

Her game was played mainly from the baseline, as described in her tennis autobiography My Waiting Game. She always played in shorts, refusing designer Teddy Tinling's offer to design dresses for her. Ultimately, he designed shorts, and later she joined his staff.

According to Lance Tingay, Mortimer was ranked in the world top 10 from 1953 through 1956 and from 1958 through 1962, reaching a career high of world No. 1 in 1961.

Mortimer was appointed Member of the Order of the British Empire (MBE) for services to Lawn Tennis in the 1967 New Year Honours. She was inducted into the International Tennis Hall of Fame in 1993.

On 27 July 2014, she received the Freedom of the Borough of Merton.

Grand Slam finals

Singles: 5 (3 titles, 2 runners-up)

Doubles: 2 (1 title, 1 runner-up)

Mixed Doubles: 1 (1 runner-up)

Grand Slam singles tournament timeline

See also
 Performance timelines for all female tennis players who reached at least one Grand Slam final

References

External links
 
 

1932 births
Living people
Australian Championships (tennis) champions
Deaf tennis players
English female tennis players
French Championships (tennis) champions
Sportspeople from Plymouth, Devon
International Tennis Hall of Fame inductees
United States National champions (tennis)
Wimbledon champions (pre-Open Era)
Grand Slam (tennis) champions in women's singles
Grand Slam (tennis) champions in women's doubles
Members of the Order of the British Empire
British female tennis players
English deaf people
Tennis people from Devon
World number 1 ranked female tennis players